Arturo Merino Benítez International Airport , also known as Santiago International Airport and Nuevo Pudahuel Airport, located in Pudahuel,  north-west of central Santiago, is Chile's largest aviation facility and busiest international airport.

Arturo Merino Benítez International Airport has domestic and international services to destinations in Europe, Oceania, Africa (cargo only), Asia and the Americas. In 2011, it was the ninth busiest airport in Latin America and the sixth busiest in South America by passenger traffic. It was the seventh busiest airport in Latin America by aircraft movements, serving 124,799 operations. Its location in Chile's most populated area, as well as in the central part of the country makes it an ideal main hub and maintenance center for most local airlines such as LATAM and Sky Airline. LATAM Airlines accounts for approximately 82% of the airport's total commercial operations.

The airport is owned by the Chilean government and has been operated since October 2015 by Nuevo Pudahuel, a consortium of companies formed by Aéroports de Paris (France), Vinci (France) and Astaldi (Italy). Air traffic control is handled by the Directorate General of Civil Aviation. Its ICAO category is 4F. The airport functions as a joint civil-military facility. It is the headquarters of the Chilean Air Force 2nd Air Brigade and where its 10th Aviation Group is based.
 
Santiago International is the longest non-stop destination for most European carriers including Iberia, Air France, and British Airways from their respective hubs in Madrid–Barajas Airport, Paris–Charles de Gaulle, and London–Heathrow Airport. In addition, LATAM flies to Frankfurt. The airport is also Latin America's main gateway to Oceania, with scheduled flights to Sydney, Melbourne, Auckland, and Easter Island.

History

Early years 

The demands of the growing metropolitan area of Santiago and the need for modern, jet-era airport facilities, which could safely accommodate both domestic and intercontinental flights, drove the need to relocate the Chilean capital's principal airport from Los Cerrillos Airport (ICAO: SCTI; IATA: ULC) in the denser southwest metropolitan region of Santiago to the more rural northwest metropolitan area.

Construction of the original terminal building, the eastern runway (17L/35R), control tower, east apron and cargo facilities commenced in 1961. On February 2, 1967, the airport was commissioned Aeropuerto Internacional de Pudahuel, due to its location in the municipality of Pudahuel. On March 19, 1980, the airport was rechristened Air Commodore Arturo Merino Benítez International Airport in honour of the founder of the Chilean Air Force and Chilean carrier LATAM Chile.

1994 expansion 
The facility was expanded in 1994 with a new international terminal that covered 90,000 square meters, inspired by the architecture of Marseille Provence Airport in France. The building is located between the two parallel runways.
This expansion added a new control tower, jetways, a duty-free zone, hotel, and greater parking area. The old terminal was used for domestic flights until 2001, when all passenger operations were merged into the same building.

In 2000, Lan Chile joined Oneworld, making of Arturo Merino Benitez Airport a main hub for the alliance, its first one in Latin America and its second in the Southern Hemisphere (after Qantas' Sydney Kingsford Smith International Airport in Australia). As of April 2014, 71% of international and 75% of domestic passengers were carried by Oneworld member airlines.
During the 2010 Chile earthquake, the passenger terminal building suffered internal damages and the collapse of a pedestrian bridge between the vehicle ramp and the departures area. Nevertheless, both runways and control tower were unharmed, allowing the realization of a massive humanitarian air-bridge held by the Chilean Air Force to Concepción, Chile (Carriel Sur International Airport), close to the most damaged area by this earthquake and subsequent tsunami. The airport authority had closed off all commercial flight operations after around 1200 UTC on February 27, resuming full operations on March 3, 2010.

In 2011, IATA recognized the DGAC (Chile's provider of air navigation services) and SCL (Santiago Airport) with the Exceptional Recognition Award to the cooperative efforts of SCL and DGAC Chile that facilitated a quick recovery from the devastation that followed the Chilean earthquake on 27 February 2010. "Both airport and air navigation services were restored quickly with no impact on rates or charges for passengers or airlines. DGAC Chile and SCL are widely regarded as leaders in Latin America for efficiency, quality, and customer focus.

In June 2011, Santiago International Airport received the Air Cargo Excellence Award, as the best Latin American Cargo Airport.

Second runway 
Construction on Runway 17R/35L began in 2004 and opened to traffic in September 2005. However, within months defects were discovered and the runway required repairing, completed in January 2006. Unfortunately further study of the problem discovered that the initial repairs were insufficient, needing additional work. Finally, 17R/35L reopened for traffic in March 2007.

2020 Master plan and expansion 
In 2008, the airport terminal reached its maximum design capacity of 9.5 million annual passengers, two years earlier than forecast, and with the repairs needed after the 2010 Chile earthquake, the Ministry of Public Works announced in 2012 that it would call for proposals for the expansion and administration of the airport, two years prior to the end of the contract with the current operator.

The ministry decided to investigate a new airport master plan instead of an expansion of the single passenger terminal building, as initially proposed by the current operator. The feasibility studies for this master plan cost 4,560 million Chilean pesos (US$9.4 million) considered in the 2011 fiscal budget.
For this new master plan, the Government hired the consultancy services of Aéroports de Paris Ingeniérie (ADP-I), the architecture, engineering and technical branch of the French airport corporation.

The master plan took into account a capacity growth to 14 million annual passengers by 2014, thirty-four million by year 2034 and 50 million passengers by 2045. New detached passenger terminal buildings for international and domestic flights, additional commercial areas and the construction of a light railway connecting the airport with the Santiago Metro network were considered.

In June 2013, the Chilean Ministry of Public Works started Phase 1 of the airport expansion.

On February 4, 2015, the consortium "Nuevo Pudahuel", formed by French companies Aéroports de Paris (45%), Vinci Airports (40%) and Italian infrastructure company Astaldi (15%) won the bidding process to manage and develop the airport for 20 years since October 1, 2015. The main missions of the new administration will be "the renovation of existing installations with the redesign and extension of the current terminal; the funding, design and construction of a new 175,000-square-meter terminal which will increase the airport's capacity to 30 million passengers, with potential for expansion beyond 45 million; the operation and commercial development for the duration of the concession (20 years) of the main infrastructures: existing terminal and new terminals, car parks and future property developments. Building works will be executed by Astaldi (50% of conception-construction pool) and Vinci Construction Grands Projets (50%)".

Passenger terminals

Terminal 1 – domestic flights 

The terminal building, originally built for both domestic and international operations until 2021, has four levels:
Ground floor: Arrivals, duty-free shop, baggage claim, transport services, parking areas, hotel access.
First floor: Administrative offices, VIP lounges (access through the second floor).
Second floor: Departures, check-in & baggage drop off hall, shops, restaurants, boarding gates.
Third floor: Restaurants and VIP check-in areas (LATAM).

Terminal 1 hosts a bank office, Chilean Automobile Club, telecommunication companies (Claro, Movistar and Entel PCS), pharmacy, travel agencies, airlines offices, insurance offices and a police station (Carabineros de Chile).

Terminal 2 – international flights 

The new international terminal covers more than 200,000 square meters. It involved an investment of $900 million USD. Construction started in August 2016 and ended in March 2021, increasing the total airport capacity from 16 to 30 million passengers per year.
The core of the new terminal consists of a central processor (T2M) where passengers undertake arrivals and departures procedures as well as four piers where the departure lounges are located.

Terminal 2 piers

Pier C 
Pier C is a structure that has 10 boarding bridges, on a surface of more than 23,700 square metres of serviceable area, and 27,600 square metres of constructed area. It opened its doors in December 2018. Its internal design and green colour are inspired by Easter Island (Rapa Nui).
The pier has more than 1,900 square metres dedicated to retail space, of which 250 square metres are allocated to Duty Free areas. The structure also has PRM assistance zones.

Pier D 
Pier D features 10 loading bridges covering an area of over 22,000 square meters and opened its doors in July 2021. Passengers are able to reach Pier D directly from the “Main Unit” (T2M) and it is a place for both domestic and international flights. The building also features commercial and gastronomic premises, a playground, an area for art and culture and aid stations for passengers with reduced mobility. The space is inspired by the Atacama region, mirrored in its range of warm colors and panels inspired by the light, energy and strength of northern Chile.

Pier E 
Pier E has 12 passenger boarding bridges on a surface of more than 26,700 square metres and opened during the second half of 2019. 
The pier has more than 1,600 square metres dedicated to retail space, of which 250 square metres are allocated to Duty Free areas. The structure will also have PRM assistance zones. It has been inspired by the region of Los Lagos (Lake District), and this is reflected in the structure's blue palette and decorative panels.

Pier F 
Pier F has 10 loading bridges in an area of over 21,000 square meters and was opened in July 2021. Passengers reach pier F directly from the “Main Unit” (T2M) and it is entirely used for international flights. The building also features commercial and gastronomic premises, a playground, an art and culture area and aid stations for passengers with reduced mobility. The space is based on Patagonia, mirrored in its range of cold colors and panels inspired by the freshness, cleanliness and calm of southern Chile.

Airline lounges 
In the international terminal, the operators are:
LATAM Airlines Lounge: Access for LATAM's Premium Business Class travellers, LATAM Pass or LATAM Fidelidade Platinum, Black and Black Signature frequent flyers.
Delta Air Lines Sky Club: Access for Delta Sky Club Members, Delta's passengers travelling in the Delta One cabin or on SkyTeam alliance Premium cabin and SkyTeam Elite Plus tier status members.
Avianca Sala VIP: Access for Avianca's International Business Class passengers, Lifemiles Elite Members (Silver, Gold & Diamond Levels), as well as Star Alliance Silver & Gold tier status frequent flyers.
Pacific Club (Priority Pass)

Hotels 
 Holiday Inn Hotels finished the construction of a five-floor building in July 2007, internally connected to both terminals (international and domestic). The hotel has 112 rooms, restaurants, bars, room-service, a conference hall for 170 people, gym, covered swimming pool, spa and wi-fi internet access.
 Hotel Diego de Almagro is located 2 km outside the airport area.
 The Hilton Garden Inn Santiago Airport Hotel is located 2.8 km from the Santiago International Airport within the ENEA, one of the largest business complexes in Santiago de Chile which hosts offices, industry and entertainment. The hotel has 144 rooms, a fitness center, indoor swimming pool, sauna, seven meeting spaces including a ballroom and business center.
 The LQ Hotel Santiago Airport (La Quinta Inns & Suites) is under construction and will be the newest hotel near the airport and the first LQ Hotel in Chile. The hotel is located 2.8 km from Santiago International Airport. The hotel will have a restaurant, indoor swimming pool, fitness center, wifi, business center and meeting space. La Quinta Arrives In Chile With An LQ Hotel Near Santiago Airport

Military functions 
The airport is the headquarters of the Chilean Air Force II Air Brigade and hosts the 10th Aviation Group facilities. The 10th Aviation Group is in charge of Strategic Air Transportation, the Airborne Early Warning & Control Squadron, medical air transport emergencies and the air transportation of the President of Chile. Some of its units are C-130 Hercules, Boeing 767-300, Boeing 737 Classic, Gulfstream IV, CASA C-212 Aviocar, F-16 Fighting Falcon, AEW&C Condor and Boeing E-3 Sentry.
The FIDAE, Latin America's most important air show takes place in the 10th Aviation Group facilities.

Airlines and destinations

Passenger

Cargo

Statistics

Ground transportation

Roads 

The airport is well served by the six-lane expressway Costanera Norte (Exit # 31), which crosses through the city from West to East bordering the Mapocho river, while it is also well connected to the West, North and North-East of Santiago by the Vespucio Norte Express Ring motorway (Exit # 18).

Taxi and shuttle services 
There are two official airport taxi services: Taxi Oficial and Taxi Vip. TransVip shuttle services reach most of Santiago's hotels, business and residential districts.

Bus 

Centropuerto buses connect the airport with Los Héroes station of Santiago Metro. Their frequency is every 10 minutes during weekdays and 15 minutes during weekends. Turbus offers a similar service to its Alameda terminal. Both these services stop at the Pajaritos metro station/bus terminal on the way.

Rental services 
Car rental services are available from the airport.

Accidents and incidents 
 On 28 April 1969 LAN Chile Flight 160, a Boeing 727 arriving from Buenos Aires, Argentina, Ministro Pistarini International Airport, crashed short of runway, 24 km north of Colina, Chile (50 km north of Arturo Merino Benítez Airport). None of the 60 passengers and crew were injured in the accident, but the aircraft was written off.

See also
Transport in Chile
List of airports in Chile

References

External links 

OpenStreetMap – Arturo Merino Benítez International Airport
Google Maps – Santiago Int'l Airport
Official web site (English)

Transport in Santiago
Airports in Santiago Metropolitan Region
Airports established in 1967
1967 establishments in Chile